A ladder match is a type of match in professional wrestling, most commonly one in which an item (usually a title belt) is hung above the ring, and the winner is the contestant who climbs a ladder and retrieves the item. The ladder itself becomes a key feature of the match, as wrestlers will use the ladder as a weapon to strike the opponent(s), as a launching pad for acrobatic attacks, and frequently these matches include impressive falls from the top of the ladder.  There have been a few matches in which the hung item must be used in a special manner in order to win the match, such as striking the opponent with the item (see Bam Bam Bigelow vs. Scott Hall taser match, where one must strike the opponent with the taser, regardless of who retrieved the taser first).

Ladder matches are often used as a finale to storylines and it is more common to have symbolic briefcases (usually "containing" a contract for a future championship match) or championship belts hung above the ring.  Ladder matches and their variants (such as TLC matches and Full Metal Mayhem) are often used in feuds that involve a dispute over possession of an item (such as a stolen title belt or the "paperwork" for the contractual services of a manager).  Ladder matches are almost always fought under no disqualification rules.

Origins
The ladder match could have been invented by either Dan Kroffat of the Stampede Wrestling organization out of Calgary, Alberta, Canada or British wrestler Kendo Nagasaki. In September 1972, Stampede Wrestling held the first ever ladder match between Dan Kroffat and Tor Kamata, where the object to be grabbed was a wad of money. In 1987, Kendo Nagasaki competed in a "disco challenge" ladder match against Clive Myers on the popular World of Sport. The aim of this match was to retrieve a gold coloured disco record suspended above the ring.

In July 1983, Stampede Wrestling held a ladder match in which Bret Hart faced off against Bad News Allen. Hart went on to join the World Wrestling Federation in 1984, and, in the early 1990s, suggested this type of match to promoter Vince McMahon, years before the gimmick achieved its eventual popularity.

The first ever ladder match in the WWF, in which Hart defeated Shawn Michaels to retain the WWF Intercontinental Title, was held in Portland, ME on July 21, 1992. The match was taped for Coliseum Video and included on the 1993 VHS release "Smack 'Em Whack 'Em", but never aired on television and remained widely unseen until its inclusion on the 2007 The Ladder Match DVD and among the bonus material on the 2011 DVD and Blu-ray collection WWE's Greatest Rivalries: Shawn Michaels vs. Bret Hart. The two performers tell interviewer Jim Ross how the match was planned along with an intended ladder rematch that never materialized.

Ladder matches in World Wrestling Federation/Entertainment/WWE 

Many ladder matches, while not officially recognized by WWE, have taken place at house shows. Ten featured Razor Ramon retaining the Intercontinental Championship against Shawn Michaels months before their WrestleMania X encounter. Another featured Razor Ramon winning the same title from Jeff Jarrett in Montreal in 1995, only to lose it back to Jarrett two nights later, as part of a series of nine unrecognized ladder matches the two had. Another featured Jeff Hardy retaining his World Heavyweight Championship against CM Punk in Denver, Co in 2009. Three ladder matches took place at consecutive house shows in 2006, where each saw Jeff Hardy defend his Intercontinental Championship. The first of these three saw Shelton Benjamin, Johnny Nitro, and Carlito as contenders. The next two nights did not feature Benjamin as he was too injured to participate.
Similar to a Stairway to Hell match, during Triple H and Kevin Nash's ladder match, a sledgehammer was hung above the ring. The first participant to retrieve it could use it as a weapon. The only ways to win the match were by pinfall or submission.

Participant list

Males

Females

Ladder matches in World Championship Wrestling

Ladder matches in NWA: Total Nonstop Action/Total Nonstop Action Wrestling/Impact Wrestling

(1) This match began as a Battle Royal but when it came down to 2 competitors it became a ladder match.
(2) The big red X, usually associated with the Ultimate X match, was used instead of a belt to win the match.

Ladder matches in Ring of Honor

Ladder matches in Pro Wrestling Guerrilla

Ladder matches in New Japan Pro-Wrestling

Ladder matches in DDT Pro-Wrestling

Ladder matches in Lucha Libre AAA Worldwide

Ladder matches in Combat Zone Wrestling

Ladder matches in All Elite Wrestling
All Elite Wrestling (AEW) primarily features two variations of a ladder match.
Casino ladder match -  where two competitors start the match, and every two minutes a new participant enters, similar to a Royal Rumble or Championship Scramble match. The first wrestler to grab a poker chip hanging above the ring wins the match (which can be won before everyone in the field has entered), and earns a future AEW World Championship match at the time and place of their choosing.
Face of the Revolution ladder match - held either at or right before their Revolution pay-per-view event in March (at the event itself in 2021 and 2022, and on the episode of Dynamite prior to the 2023 event). This is a traditional style ladder match, with all wrestlers starting the match in the ring. A giant brass ring hangs above the ring, and whoever climbs the ladder and grabs the ring wins the match, and earns a future AEW TNT Championship match.

Other variations
King of the Mountain match (Queen of the Mountain when female wrestlers are involved) – used in Impact Wrestling; essentially a ladder match in reverse, the winner (referred to as the "King/Queen of the Mountain") is the first person to attach the object specified beforehand (usually a championship belt) to the wire above the ring.  However, wrestlers cannot go for the belt unless they have scored a pinfall, after which the pinned wrestler must spend some time in a penalty box.
Full Metal Mayhem - Impact Wrestling's version of the Tables, Ladders, and Chairs match.
Stairway to Hell – Used mainly in ECW; in this variation of the ladder match instead of a title being suspended above the ring there's a weapon, usually a ball of barbed wire or a kendo stick. Once you've taken down the weapon you are then free to use it, you win the match via pin or submission the same as a singles match.

Tables, Ladders, and Chairs (TLC) match – Variation of the ladder match where tables and chairs are also permitted (and their use is encouraged). 
Money in the Bank ladder match – Exclusively used in WWE; a Ladder match where multiple competitors try to climb a ladder to obtain a contract for a future World Title shot anytime within the next 12 months. Challenger chooses time and place. Match took place at every WrestleMania from WrestleMania 21 to WrestleMania XXVI, after which it was moved to its own annual Money in the Bank pay-per-view.
Tables, Ladders, and Cervezas match – Exclusively used in WSX; variation of the Tables, Ladder, and Chairs match except instead of permitting chairs, cervezas (Spanish for beers) is permitted along with tables and ladders (and their use is encouraged).
Tables, Ladders, Chairs, and Canes match - This match is a TLC match with the addition of Singapore Canes.
Tables, Ladders, Chairs, and Stairs match - This match is a TLC match with the addition of steel stairs. It was so named because the 2014 TLC event also involved a Steel Stairs match.

Notes

References

External links 
 WWE.com – Ladder match description

Professional wrestling match types